Robert L. Pritchard (born 1941) is a Sydney-based lawyer active in the energy and resources sector. He is managing director of ResourcesLaw International and executive director of the Energy Policy Institute of Australia.

Career 
Pritchard is the managing director of consultancy ResourcesLaw International, chairman of SMR Nuclear Technology and executive director of the Energy Policy Institute of Australia. He also works as a consultant for the Australian legal firm, Piper Alderman and is chairman of the board of the St Baker Energy Innovation Fund. He is also a fellow of the Australian Institute of Energy.

Pritchard was founding Chairman of the Section on Energy and Resources Law of the International Bar Association and served on the Finance Committee of the World Energy Council for nine years.

Pritchard lectures Masters Program students on Global Energy and Resources Law at the University of Sydney. He has written and edited various publications about the resources and energy sector and the law, including Economic Development, Foreign Investment and the Law (1996).

He is a former member of the Advisory Committee of the CSIRO Energy Transformed Research Flagship.

Nuclear industrial development 
Pritchard is an advocate for the legalisation of nuclear power in Australia. He is chair of SMR Nuclear Technology, which intends to develop and deploy small modular reactors in Australia. He previously worked on the acquisition of the Australian Atomic Energy Commission's interest in the Ranger Uranium Project and the subsequent listing of Energy Resources of Australia Ltd on the Australian Securities Exchange.

References 

1941 births
Living people
20th-century Australian lawyers
21st-century Australian lawyers